The Department of Transportation and Public Works (DTOP)— is the  Executive Department of the Commonwealth of Puerto Rico that regulates transportation and public works in Puerto Rico. The agency's headquarters are located in San Juan.

Agencies
The following agencies are involved in transportation issues of Puerto Rico.
 style="margin: 0 auto"
! scope=col style="text-align: left" | Name in English
! scope=col style="text-align: left" | Name in Spanish
! scope=col style="text-align: left" | Abbreviation in Spanish
|-
| Commission on Traffic Safety
| Comisión para la Seguridad en el Tránsito
| CST
|-
| Highways and Transportation Authority
| Autoridad de Carreteras y Transportación
| ACT
|-
| Maritime Transport Authority
| Autoridad de Transporte Marítimo
| ATM
|-
| Metropolitan Bus Authority
| Autoridad Metropolitana de Autobuses
| AMA
|-
| Ports Authority
| Autoridad de los Puertos
| AP
|-

Secretary

References

External links
 Puerto Rico Department of Transportation and Public Works 

 
Executive departments of the government of Puerto Rico
State departments of transportation of the United States